"I'm Just an Old Chunk of Coal (But I'm Gonna Be a Diamond Someday)" is a song written and originally recorded by Billy Joe Shaver.  American country music artist John Anderson released the song in March 1981 as the first single from his album John Anderson 2.  The song reached number 4 on the Billboard Hot Country Singles & Tracks chart.

The song is briefly sung by the title character in one scene of Jimmy Neutron: Boy Genius and featured in the end credits of Norm Macdonald's Netflix comedy special Norm Macdonald: Nothing Special. Two covers of the song were released in 2022, performed by Jamey Johnson on the John Anderson tribute album Something Borrowed, Something New and Miranda Lambert on the Billy Joe Shaver tribute album Live Forever.

Chart performance

References

1981 singles
1981 songs
John Anderson (musician) songs
Jamey Johnson songs
Miranda Lambert songs
Songs written by Billy Joe Shaver
Song recordings produced by Norro Wilson
Warner Records singles